Philoponella feroka is a spider of the Uloboridae family.

Description

Range
Kerala, Andhra Pradesh, Gujarat and Karnataka in India.

Habitat
Paddy fields, fences, and shrubs found next to the highway.

Ecology
Found on the webs of the social spider Stegodyphus sarasinorum.

Etymology

Taxonomy

References

Uloboridae